Île du Levant, sometimes referred to as Le Levant, is a French island in the Mediterranean off the coast of the Riviera, near Toulon. It is one of the four that constitute the Îles d'Hyères. Part of the island is occupied by the naturist resort of Heliopolis and the rest is under military control.

History

Ancient history
In the early Bronze Age the deposits at Petit Avis attest to the intermittent passage of man. Then in the Iron Age, in Liserot Cove, in the 7th century BC the occupation remains transient. It becomes permanent there only from the sixth to the fifth century BC. Then, after a long period of abandonment, it was inhabited again in the 1st century BC, Greek and Ligurian dishes were found on the island.

The island was part of the Greek colony of Massalia (modern Marseille).

Modern history
Monks lived on the island beginning in the 15th century; the ruins of their monastery still exist on the island. From 1861 until 1878, the island was a penitentiary for young offenders and orphans, of whom 89 died here. A plaque (located on the military part of the island) commemorates them.

In 1931, Gaston and André Durville, both doctors, established Héliopolis, Europe's first naturist village, on the island. As the doctors Durville said in 1931

Geography 

About 90% of the island is reserved for a military missile test centre (the Centre d'Essais de Lancement de Missiles) which has launched numerous research and testing rockets since its establishment in 1948. The remaining 10% is open to civilians.

The village was built on hillsides and is dominated by Fort Napoleon. The village has a post office, a village hall, a chapel and a police station as well as a grocery, a bakery, and two galleries. The port area houses the office of the Capitaine du Port, a clothing store and small general store. In between there is a bazaar (Le Bazar d'Héliopolis) offering food, hardware, a tabac and cafe bar. There are a number of hotels and bed-and-breakfasts, and eight restaurants (Le Gecko, La Fourmi, La Palmeraie, La Gambaro, Héliotel, Le Minimum, La Pomme d'Adam, La Bohème), all catering for naturists.

Climate

Île du Levant has a hot-summer Mediterranean climate (Köppen climate classification Csa).

Culture 

The Bain de Diane and the Plage des Grottes (a nude beach) are reserved for naturists; nudity is formally obligatory there. Being nude is allowed (and expected) everywhere on the public area of the island, except in the immediate vicinity of the harbour. In the harbour, it is formally necessary to wear what the French jokingly call , often a pareo or a string. In conformance with the relaxed atmosphere of the island, this rule is not really enforced, but generally well observed. Inside restaurants outside the village centre, some clothing, although often flimsy, is often worn but toplessness (for women and men) is quite accepted there and le minimum considered sufficient attire; on the outside terraces, nudity is common, especially at lunchtime. At least two restaurants, La Fourmi and Heliotel, actively encourage customers to be nude, even at dinner.

The island sees a number of scuba divers; these generally do not partake in the nudist lifestyle.

The non-military part of the island is private property. The owners form the Association Syndicale Libre des Propriétaires à l'Île du Levant.

The island can be reached by boat from Hyères and from Le Lavandou. As no cars are allowed on the island (except for some four utility cars), these ferries do not take cars.

In popular culture

A 1956 film by Werner Kunz was called Isle of Levant and featured so-called "nudist camp" footage.

The island is used as a setting in the Robert A. Heinlein  novel Glory Road and in the Mario Reading novel The Music Makers.

The island was mentioned in Are You Being Served? episode "Hoorah for the Holidays" as a presumed destination for Captain Peacock's annual vacation. Miss Brahms calls it "a nudist colony" but Captain Peacock insists it's a "nature camp".

The island, and a nod to its nudist history, was also featured in the French film Nos Futurs (Our Futures).

It was also the setting for a short story, The Reluctant Nudist, featuring Leslie Charteris' character The Saint. The Reluctant Nudist appeared in the collection published as The Saint Around the World

"The Incompleat Guide to the Île du Levant", Henry N. Manney III and Russell Brockbank (illustrator), Road & Track, March 1964.

See also 

 Cap d'Agde
 Euronat (naturist resort)
 CHM Montalivet
 Naturism in France
 List of French naturist beaches (In French)
 List of social nudity places in France, Europe
 Platais Island
 Naturism
 Wreck of Rochelongue

Notes

Further reading

External links 

 Levant Island tourism
 Ile du Levant official tourist informations
 https://web.archive.org/web/20151222173256/http://www.iledulevant.com.fr/en/
 Ile du Levant
 Ile du Levant Chronology and Launch Log
 Ile du Levant Naturist Web Site
 Map of the island in JPEG format, from the Hyères Office of Tourism

Islands of Provence-Alpes-Côte d'Azur
Landforms of Var (department)
Naturist resorts
Nude beaches
Rocket launch sites
Levant
Naturism in France